I Died a Thousand Times is a 1955 American CinemaScope Warnercolor film noir directed by Stuart Heisler. The drama features Jack Palance as paroled bank robber Roy Earle, with Shelley Winters, Lee Marvin, Earl Holliman, Perry Lopez, Pedro Gonzalez Gonzalez, and Lon Chaney, Jr.

I Died a Thousand Times is a scene-by-scene remake of High Sierra (1941), which was based upon a novel by W.R. Burnett and starred Humphrey Bogart as Earle. The same story had also been transformed into the Western Colorado Territory (1949), with Joel McCrea.

Plot
Roy "Mad Dog" Earle (Jack Palance), an aging bank robber, intends to pull off one last heist before retiring.

Sprung from prison by crime boss Big Mac (Lon Chaney Jr.), Earle agrees to plan the robbery of a resort hotel. His partners include the hotheaded Babe (Lee Marvin), easy-going Red (Earl Holliman), and an "inside man" at the hotel, Louis Mendoza (Perry Lopez). Along for the ride is Marie (Shelley Winters), a dance-hall girl whom Babe recently met.

Marie falls in love with Earle, but he is more interested in Velma (Lori Nelson), the club-footed daughter of a farmer (Ralph Moody) whom Earle earlier befriended.

Intending to use his share of the loot to pay for Velma's needed operation, Earle goes through with the robbery, only to be thwarted by the ineptitude of his gang, the treachery of the late Big Mac's successors, and the fickle Velma.

With the still faithful Marie by his side, Earle makes a desperate escape into the Sierra Nevada, where a police sniper shoots him down.

Cast
 Jack Palance as Roy Earle aka Roy Collins
 Shelley Winters as Marie Garson
 Lori Nelson as Velma Goodhue
 Lee Marvin as Babe Kossuck
 Pedro Gonzalez Gonzalez as Chico
 Lon Chaney Jr. as Big Mac
 Earl Holliman as Red
 Perry Lopez as Louis Mendoza
 Richard Davalos as Lon Preisser
 Howard St. John as Doc Banton
 Nick Adams as Bellboy (uncredited)
 Dennis Hopper as Joe (uncredited)
 Ralph Moody as Pa Goodhue 
 Olive Carey as Ma Goodhue 
 Dub Taylor as Ed (uncredited)
 Paul Brinegar as Bus Driver (uncredited)
 James Millican as Jack Kranmer

Background
The stereotypical, comedy-relief character played by black actor Willie Best in the original film was replaced by a Mexican stereotype played by Pedro Gonzalez Gonzalez. The film marks the second motion picture appearance of Dennis Hopper's six-decade career, and Nick Adams makes an uncredited appearance as a bellhop.

Reception

Bosley Crowther of The New York Times did not like the remake, specifically the screenplay and its inadvertent message, and wrote "Somehow it isn't quite as touching as it was fourteen years ago. Not by a lot-—and the trouble is not wholly Mr. Palance...But the reason this film is not so touching is because it is antique and absurd—-the kind of glorification of the gunman that was obsolescent when High Sierra was made. It is an insult to social institutions and to public intelligence to pull this old mythological hero out of the archives and set him on a mountain top again. The pretense is so blunt and sentimental that it makes the whole thing a total cliché. And the acting does not greatly improve it...It is obvious that High Sierra has come to pretty low ground."

In 2004, film critic Dennis Schwartz wrote "It's a remake that was hardly needed, but at least it keeps things the same as the novel and gives the viewer a chance to observe Jack Palance in the role Bogie made classic and Shelley Winters in Ida Lupino's role. Though both actors acquit themselves well, there's still no comparison with the original legendary actors. I have a thing about remakes of classics, believing there's no point to make them...I had no problems with the pic, in fact it works rather well. If it weren't an unnecessary remake I would think more highly of it."

See also
List of American films of 1955

References

External links
 
 
 
 
 
 

1955 films
1955 crime drama films
1955 romantic drama films
American heist films
Color film noir
CinemaScope films
1950s English-language films
Films based on American novels
Films based on works by W. R. Burnett
Films directed by Stuart Heisler
Films scored by David Buttolph
Warner Bros. films
Remakes of American films
American crime drama films
American romantic drama films
1950s heist films
1950s American films